Wicked Tuna is an American reality television series about commercial tuna fishermen based in Gloucester, Massachusetts, who fish for the lucrative Atlantic bluefin tuna in the North Atlantic Ocean. The teams of fishermen battle each other to see who can get the most profit out of catching the fish. The series has aired on National Geographic Channel since April 1, 2012.

In addition to offering an inside look at one of America’s oldest industries, Wicked Tuna sheds light on important issues surrounding the fate of the bluefin tuna. Captains adhere to U.S. regulations that determine size limits and quotas for the season.

Following Season 8 of Wicked Tuna: Outer Banks, National Geographic retitled the 2022 Season as Season 1  of Wicked Tuna: Outer Banks Showdown.

Vessels

Current

Former

Episodes 

Ten complete seasons of Wicked Tuna have aired.

Wicked Tuna: Hooked Up 
These are replays of the original 25 episodes but with extra trivia boxes which contain additional insights into the fishermen's thoughts, attitudes, and personalities. Wicked Tuna: Outer Banks also has a Hooked Up version called Wicked Tuna: Outer Banks or Bust.

Season winners

Spin-off 

After season 2 of Wicked Tuna, Nat Geo announced a spin-off of the show set off the coast of the Outer Banks in North Carolina. The spin-off was named Wicked Tuna: North vs. South. Several vessels from the original show also appear in this version.
Following the first season, Wicked Tuna: North vs. South was renamed Wicked Tuna: Outer Banks for its second season.

Broadcast schedule 
The following table is an timeline overview of how both Wicked Tuna and Wicked Tuna: Outer Banks series have been released:

See also 
 Deadliest Catch
 Lobster Wars
 Lobstermen: Jeopardy at Sea
 Swords: Life on the Line
 Whale Wars

References

External links 
Wicked Tuna at the National Geographic Channel
 

2012 American television series debuts
2010s American reality television series
English-language television shows
Fishing television series
Television shows set in Massachusetts
Gloucester, Massachusetts